Pierre Laurent Wantzel (5 June 1814 in Paris – 21 May 1848 in Paris) was a French mathematician who proved that several ancient geometric problems were impossible to solve using only compass and straightedge.

In a paper from 1837, Wantzel proved that the problems of
 doubling the cube, and
 trisecting the angle
are impossible to solve if one uses only compass and straightedge. In the same paper he also solved the problem of determining which regular polygons are constructible:
 a regular polygon is constructible if and only if the number of its sides is the product of a power of two and any number of distinct Fermat primes (i.e. that the sufficient conditions given by Carl Friedrich Gauss are also necessary)
The solution to these problems had been sought for thousands of years, particularly by the ancient Greeks. However, Wantzel's work was neglected by his contemporaries and essentially forgotten. Indeed, it was only 50 years after its publication that Wantzel's article was mentioned either in a journal article or in a textbook. Before that, it seems to have been mentioned only once, by Julius Petersen, in his doctoral thesis of 1871. It was probably due to an article published about Wantzel by Florian Cajori more than 80 years after the publication of Wantzel's article that his name started to be well-known among mathematicians.

This theorem would be rediscovered decades later by (and sometimes attributed to) Vincenzo Mollame and Otto Hölder.

References

External links
 Profile from School of Mathematics and Statistics; University of St Andrews, Scotland

1814 births
1848 deaths
19th-century French mathematicians
French geometers